Steven Shapin (born 1943) is an American historian and sociologist of science. He is the Franklin L. Ford Research Professor of the History of Science at Harvard University. He is considered one of the earliest scholars on the sociology of scientific knowledge, and is credited with creating new approaches. He has won many awards, including the 2014 George Sarton Medal of the History of Science Society for career contributions to the field.

Career 
Shapin was trained as a biologist at Reed College and did graduate work in genetics at the University of Wisconsin before taking a Ph.D. in the History and Sociology of Science at the University of Pennsylvania in 1971.

From 1972 to 1989, he was Lecturer, then Reader, at the Science Studies Unit, University of Edinburgh, and, from 1989 to 2003, Professor of Sociology at the University of California, San Diego, before taking up an appointment at the Department of the History of Science at Harvard. He has taught for brief periods at Columbia University, Tel-Aviv University, and at the University of Gastronomic Sciences in Pollenzo, Italy. In 2012, he was the S. T. Lee Visiting Professorial Fellow, School of Advanced Study, University of London.

He has written broadly on the history and sociology of science.  Among his concerns are scientists, their ethical choices, and the basis of scientific credibility. He revisioned the role of experiment by examining where experiments took place and who performed them. He is credited with restructuring the field's approach to “big issues” in science such as truth, trust, scientific identity, and moral authority.

His books on 17th-century science include the "classic book" Leviathan and the Air-Pump: Hobbes, Boyle, and the Experimental Life (1985, with Simon Schaffer); his "path-breaking book" A Social History of Truth (1994), The Scientific Revolution (1996, now translated into 18 languages), and, on modern entrepreneurial science, The Scientific Life (2008).  A collection of his essays is Never Pure (2010). His current research interests include the history of dietetics and the history and sociology of taste and subjective judgment, especially in relation to food and wine.

He is a regular contributor to the London Review of Books and he has written for Harper's Magazine and The New Yorker.

Awards

His honors include the John Desmond Bernal Prize (2001) and the Ludwik Fleck Prize of the Society for Social Studies of Science (1996), the Robert K. Merton Prize of the American Sociological Association, the Herbert Dingle Prize of the British Society for the History of Science (1999), a Guggenheim Fellowship (1979), the Derek Price Prize of the History of Science Society, a Fellowship at the Center for Advanced Study in the Behavioral Sciences, and, with Simon Schaffer, the Erasmus Prize (2005). He is a Fellow of the American Academy of Arts and Sciences. In 2014, he received the George Sarton Medal of the History of Science Society for career contributions to the field. In 2020 he was nominated to be a fellow at Institute for Advanced Studies in the Humanities.

Bibliography
 With Barry Barnes (ed.), Natural order: Historical Studies of Scientific Culture, Beverly Hills, CA: Sage Publications, 1979.
 With Simon Schaffer, Leviathan and the Air-Pump: Hobbes, Boyle, and the Experimental Life; including a translation of Thomas Hobbes, Dialogus physicus de natura aeris by Simon Schaffer, Princeton, N.J.: Princeton University Press, 1985; 1989; new edition, 2011
 A Social History of Truth: Civility and Science in Seventeenth-Century England, Chicago: University of Chicago Press, 1994.
 The Scientific Revolution, Chicago: University of Chicago Press, 1996.
 With Christopher Lawrence (ed.), Science Incarnate: Historical Embodiments of Natural Knowledge, Chicago: University of Chicago Press, 1998.
 The Scientific Life: A Moral History of a Late Modern Vocation, Chicago: The University of Chicago Press, 2008.
 Never pure: historical studies of science as if it was produced by people with bodies, situated in time, space, culture, and society, and struggling for credibility and authority, Baltimore, MD: Johns Hopkins University Press, 2010, 568 pages.
 "A Theorist of (Not Quite) Everything" (review of David Cahan, Helmholtz: A Life in Science, University of Chicago Press, 2018, 937 pp.), The New York Review of Books, vol. LXVI, no. 15 (10 October 2019), pp. 29–31.

References

External links

Faculty home page
Curriculum Vitae of Steven Shapin 

1943 births
Living people
Academics of the University of Edinburgh
American sociologists
Harvard University faculty
Historians of science
Hobbes scholars
The New Yorker people
Reed College alumni
University of California, San Diego faculty
University of Wisconsin–Madison alumni